Delaware's 16th Senate district is one of 21 districts in the Delaware Senate. It has been represented by Republican Eric Buckson since 2022.

Geography
District 16 covers southern Dover and its suburbs in Kent County, including Highland Acres, Rising Sun-Lebanon, Kent Acres, Riverview, Magnolia, Woodside, Woodside East, Frederica, Little Creek, Bowers, and Little Heaven.

Like all districts in the state, the 16th Senate district is located entirely within Delaware's at-large congressional district. It overlaps with the 28th, 29th, 32nd, 33rd, and 34th districts of the Delaware House of Representatives.

Recent election results
Delaware Senators are elected to staggered four-year terms. Under normal circumstances, the 16th district holds elections in midterm years, except immediately after redistricting, when all seats are up for election regardless of usual cycle.

2018

2014

2012

Federal and statewide results in District 16

References 

16
Kent County, Delaware